Maekiaphan Phillips is a U.S. Virgin Islander indigenous rights activist and nonprofit executive serving as the kasike of the Guainía Taino Tribe of the Virgin Islands. She is the founder and president of the nonprofit Opi'a Taino International, Inc. In 2021, due largely to her efforts, the Governor of the US Virgin Islands issued a proclamation officially recognizing the tribe.

Early life 
Phillips is great-granddaughter of Francisca Almestica Delgado and the granddaughter of Bellencita Almestica. According to Phillips, her great-grandmother, at the age of 14, was kidnapped from Vieques, Puerto Rico by the pirate James Abbott.  Almestica Delgado was brought to Salt Island, British Virgin Islands where she later had children with an African man.

Career 
Phillips, her husband Tesroy Phillips, and their 12 children have worked towards federal tribal recognition. Phillips established and serves as the president of the nonprofit Opi'a Taino International, Inc. an organization that aims to restore the cultural heritage, raise awareness of, and educate about the Taino, Arawak, and Kalinago peoples.

In 2012, Phillips became kasike of the Guainía Taino Tribe of the Virgin Islands. That year, she lectured on the Taino culture at the Virgin Islands Humanities Council’s center. In March 2016, Phillips testified in support of indigenous cultural protections to the culture, historic preservation, youth, and recreation committee of the legislature of the Virgin Islands. She also shared details on her own indigenous Taino background. In 2017, Phillips hosted a pow wow in Saint Thomas on the International Day of the World's Indigenous Peoples.

After Hurricane Irma, Phillips and Opi'a Taino, Inc. served free meals. She worked for the nonprofit All Hands and Hearts – Smart Response and led efforts to rebuild after Hurricane Maria. Phillips converted her home kitchen into a commercial kitchen to feed 50 to 80 people daily.

In June 2021, after an almost 10-year campaign led by Phillips, governor Albert Bryan signed a proclamation recognizing the Guainía Taino Tribe of the Virgin Islands.The proclamation states that the tribe can “...establish eligibility for federal health benefits, federal education benefits, housing benefits, job training, land use, and the right to engage in traditional religious practices and ceremonies.“ In April 2022, she led outreach to those with Taíno ancestry. Phillips has advocated for the creation of a tourist destination, a preserved area on Saint Thomas to be used as a batey.

References

Citations

Bibliography 

Living people
Year of birth missing (living people)
People from Saint Thomas, U.S. Virgin Islands
Tribal chiefs of the Caribbean
Taíno leaders
21st-century Native American women
21st-century Native Americans
Female Native American leaders
United States Virgin Islands people of African descent
United States Virgin Islands women
United States Virgin Islands activists
United States Virgin Islands businesspeople
Native American activists
21st-century American businesswomen
21st-century American businesspeople
American nonprofit chief executives
American women company founders
United States Virgin Islands people of Puerto Rican descent